Stephen Barth is an American lawyer, professor, author, keynote speaker and entrepreneur. He is a professor of leadership and hospitality law at the Conrad N. Hilton College of Hotel and Restaurant Management at the University of Houston.  He is also the co-author of Hospitality Law 5th Edition and Restaurant Law Basics.

Education
 Bachelor of Arts in Economics, Texas Tech University, 1977
 Master of Arts in Communications, Texas Tech University, 1979
 Juris Doctor in Law, Texas Tech University, 1984
 Licensed to the State Bar of Texas, 1984

Career

Legal
After working in the hospitality industry, Barth attended law school and was licensed by the State Bar of Texas. He was also a founding member of the Hospitality Industry Bar Association. Barth's articles on legal issues are regularly published in a variety of hospitality publications.

Academia
Barth's thirty year career at the Conrad N. Hilton College of Hotel and Restaurant Management, University of Houston, focuses on researching and teaching hospitality law and leadership.  Previously, he taught Legal Aspects of Hospitality Management at Texas Tech University. He was also selected as an instructor by the Educational Institute of the American Hotel and Lodging Association to teach its Certified Hospitality Educator (CHE) program.

Hospitality industry

Barth spent over twenty years working, managing, owning, and consulting in the restaurant and night club industries.

HospitalityLawyer.com 

In 2000 Barth founded HospitalityLawyer.com, an online resource for the hospitality industry. HospitalityLawyer.com hosts two industry conferences, The Global Travel Risk Summit series, an intensive educational conference surrounding a business's "Duty of Care" to mobile employees, and The Hospitality Law Conference,  each year in Houston, Texas both of which re targeted at hospitality and travel professionals.

Professional speaker

Barth was a longtime member of the National Speakers Association. His presentations focus on topics including emotional intelligence, emotionally intelligent leadership, positive leadership techniques, mutual meeting contracts, and methods for mitigating liability in the hospitality and business travel industries. He was a keynote speaker for the World Association of Chef's Societies  and the 2012 Best Western Business Travel Forum.

Publications

Books

 Hospitality Law: Managing Legal Issues in the Hospitality Industry. 5th Ed. (John Wiley & Sons, 2017).
 Restaurant Law Basics: Wiley Restaurant Basics Series (John Wiley & Sons, 2001).

Awards and honors 
 Career Teaching Excellence Award, Conrad N. Hilton College, University of Houston, 2018
 HospitalityLawyer.com Twitter Feed included in Top Hospitality Leaders to Follow on Twitter, Capterra Hotel Management Blog, 2016

References

1956 births
American motivational speakers
Texas lawyers
Legal educators
Living people
Texas Tech University alumni
Texas Tech University School of Law alumni
University of Houston faculty
Businesspeople in the hospitality industry